The Men's 5000 metres at the 2000 Summer Olympics as part of the athletics programme was held at Stadium Australia on Wednesday 27 September, and Saturday 30 September 2000. The top six runners in each of the initial two heats automatically qualified for the final. The next three fastest runners from across the heats also qualified. There were a total number of 38 participating athletes.

Medalists

Records

Results
All times shown are in seconds.
 Q denotes qualification by place in heat.
 q denotes qualification by overall place.
 DNS denotes did not start.
 DNF denotes did not finish.
 DQ denotes disqualification.
 NR denotes national record.
 OR denotes Olympic record.
 WR denotes world record.
 PB denotes personal best.
 SB denotes season best.

Qualifying heats

Overall Results Semi-Finals

Final

See also
 1999 Men's World Championships 5.000 metres
 2001 Men's World Championships 5.000 metres

References

External links
 Official Report
 Results

 
5000 metres at the Olympics
Men's events at the 2000 Summer Olympics